Philip Hamburger is an American legal scholar. Hamburger holds a Juris Doctor from Yale Law School (1982) and a Bachelor of Arts from Princeton University (1979).

Hamburger is the Maurice and Hilda Friedman Professor of Law at the Columbia University School of Law.  He is a legal historian and a scholar of constitutional law.  Before moving to Columbia, Hamburger was John P. Wilson Professor at the University of Chicago Law School, where he was also Director of the Bigelow Program and the Legal History Program. He was previously Oswald Symyster Colclough Research Professor at George Washington University Law School and, before that, he taught at the University of Connecticut Law School.  He has been a visiting professor at the University of Virginia Law School and was the Jack N. Pritzker Distinguished Visiting Professor of Law at Northwestern Law School.  Early in his career, he was an associate at the law firm of Schnader, Harrison, Segal & Lewis LLP in Philadelphia.

Scholarship

Hamburger is a leading scholar of the First Amendment who has studied "Jefferson's thinking and actions with respect to matters of church and state".  He is known for arguing that "the First Amendment, originally thought to limit the government, has been increasingly interpreted by the Court to mean limiting religion and confining it to the private sphere."

Hamburger has criticized Justice Hugo Black, who served on the Supreme Court 1937 to 1971, arguing that Black's views on the need for separation of Church and State were deeply tainted by prominent roles in the Ku Klux Klan, which, beyond its well-known role as an anti-Black extremist hate group, also harbored extreme anti-Catholic views. Hamburger relies on Black's biographers who say he was a KKK member and actively campaigned for Senate in 1926 at nearly all of Alabama's 148 KKK Klaverns, where he attacked the Catholic Church. Biographer Newman quotes his campaign manager as saying Black "could make the best anti-Catholic speech you ever heard."

Publications

 Is Administrative Law Unlawful? (University of Chicago Press, 2014)
 "Beyond Protection," Columbia Law Review (2009)
 Law and Judicial Duty (Harvard University Press, 2008) excerpt and text search
 Separation of Church and State (Harvard University Press, 2002)
 "Religious Liberty in Philadelphia," Emory Law Journal (2005)
 "The New Censorship:  Institutional Review Boards," Supreme Court Review (2004)
 Separation of Church and State (Harvard U.P,. 2004)  excerpt and text search
 "More is Less," Virginia Law Review (2004)
 "Law and Judicial Duty," George Washington Law Review (2003)
 "Liberality," Texas Law Review (2002)
 "Revolution and Judicial Review:  Chief Justice Holt's Opinion in City of London v. Wood," Columbia Law Review (1994)
 Liberal Suppression:  Section 501(c)(3) and the Taxation of Speech, University of Chicago Press (2018)
 Purchasing Submission: Conditions, Power, and Freedom (Harvard University Press, 2021)

References

Further reading
 Peter Steinfels, "Beliefs; Behind the concept of the separation of church and state, a scholar finds some unsettling origins," []1131F935A35754C0A9649C8B63 New York Times, July 6, 2002 ]

Columbia University faculty
Living people
American legal scholars
Scholars of constitutional law
Princeton University alumni
Yale Law School alumni
Year of birth missing (living people)